Wu-Tang Records Presents... Myalansky & Joe Mafia in Wu-Syndicate is the debut studio album by American hip hop group Wu-Syndicate. It was released on April 20, 1999 through Wu-Tang Records with distribution via Priority Records. Production was handled by DJ Devastator, Smokin' Joe, Mathematics and Dred, with RZA serving as executive producer. It features guest appearances from fellow Wu-Tang affiliates 12 O'Clock, KGB and Trigga. The album debuted at number 61 on the US Billboard 200 albums chart.

NME praised the song "Where Was Heaven" and considered Joe Mafia's rhymes to be "fluent" and "dizzying". AllMusic's Keith Farley commented on the album's production and considered it "far from the worst Wu-Tang cash in".

Track listing 
Track listing information is taken from the official liner notes and AllMusic. No individual song writing credits are given.

Personnel
Joseph K. Outlaw a.k.a. Joe Mafia – rap vocals (tracks: 1-7, 9-15, 17-18)
Timothy Eugene Turner a.k.a. Myalansky – rap vocals (tracks: 1-4, 6-16, 18)
Corey Hart a.k.a. Napoleon – rap vocals (tracks: 1, 3, 7, 9, 10, 12, 18)
Odion Turner a.k.a. 12 O'Clock – rap vocals (tracks: 3, 10)
Thomas Cassidy a.k.a. Trigga – rap vocals (track 17)
Klik Ga Bow – rap vocals (track 17)
David "DJ Devastator" Walker – producer (tracks: 1, 3-8, 10, 11, 14, 15)
Ronald Maurice Bean – producer (tracks: 2, 13)
E the Dred – producer (tracks: 9, 12)
Smokin' Joe – producer (tracks: 16-18)
Robert Fitzgerald Diggs – executive producer
Nolan 'Dr. No' Moffitte – engineering
Michele "Michou" Robinson – art direction, design

Charts

References

External links

1999 debut albums
Priority Records albums
Albums produced by Mathematics